is a gigantic ruler of the Oni, creatures of Japanese folklore.

In popular culture:
 , a character in the anime Ronin Warriors
 Shutendouji, a character in the anime Otogizoshi
 , a manga by Go Nagai
 , a video game published by Enix in 1990, adapted from Go Nagai's manga
 , a professional wrestling stable founded by Kudo, Masahiro Takanashi and Yukio Sakaguchi. 
 Jutendouji, a fusion monster used by Kurando in the PlayStation 2 game Shadow Hearts: Covenant
 Ninja Sentai Kakuranger has 2 Shutendouji as brothers who are the monsters of the week & appear in Mighty Morphin Alien Rangers as the Barbaric brothers.

it:Shutendoji
ja:酒呑童子